The 1990–91 South Midlands League season was 62nd in the history of South Midlands League.

Premier Division

The Premier Division featured 17 clubs which competed in the division last season, along with 3 new clubs:
Harpenden Town, promoted from last season's Division One
Wingate, promoted from last season's Division One
Letchworth Garden City, relegated from Isthmian League Division Two North

Also Milton Keynes/Wolverton Town changed their name to Wolverton.

League table

Division One

The Division One featured 14 clubs which competed in the division last season, along with 4 new clubs:
Shefford Town, relegated from Premier Division
Oxford City
Potters Bar Crusaders, joined from Herts County League Division One
Flamstead

League table

References

1990–91
8